The  is a five-volume geography by Japanese Confucian philosopher, government official, and poet Arai Hakuseki (1657–1725). Completed in 1713, it the first work of world geography published in Japan. Based on knowledge that Hakuseki gained through conversations with missionary Giovanni Battista Sidotti, and referencing such works as Matteo Ricci's Great Map of Ten Thousand Countries, the books describe the geography, history, customs, and biological organisms of the world as known during Hakuseki's day.

Edo-period works
1713 books
Geography books